Karsten Mario Bailey (born April 26, 1977) is a former American football wide receiver in the National Football League. He was drafted by the Seattle Seahawks in the third round of the 1999 NFL Draft. He played college football at Auburn.

Bailey also played for the Green Bay Packers.

1977 births
Living people
People from Newnan, Georgia
Sportspeople from the Atlanta metropolitan area
Players of American football from Georgia (U.S. state)
American football wide receivers
Auburn Tigers football players
Seattle Seahawks players
Green Bay Packers players